Czukty  (from 1938-45 Schuchten) is a village in the administrative district of Gmina Kowale Oleckie, within Olecko County, Warmian-Masurian Voivodeship, in north-eastern Poland.

It is part of the region of Masuria.

History
Czukty was founded in 1560 by Mikołaj Czukta, who bought land to establish a village. It was named after the founder. As of 1600, the population of the village was solely Polish. In 1939, it had a population of 190.

Notable residents
 Willy Langkeit (1907–1969), Wehrmacht general

References

Villages in Olecko County
1560 establishments in Poland
Populated places established in 1560